Merzhanov (masculine) or Merzhanova (feminine) is a Russian surname. Notable people with the surname include:

Miron Merzhanov (1895–1975), Russian Soviet architect
Victor Merzhanov (1919–2012), Russian classical pianist

Russian-language surnames